Ross Cox (1793–1853) was an Irish clerk in the Pacific Fur Company and the North West Company, later writing of his experiences.

Life
Ross Cox was born in Dublin, Ireland, in 1793, the son of Samuel Cox and Margaret Thorpe. He emigrated to America in 1811, becoming a clerk in the Pacific Fur Company. He arrived in Fort Astoria in 1812, the primary station of the PFC. Due to the War of 1812 the company was liquidated and sold to the North West Company in 1813. He then became a clerk with the North West Company, but he retired 1817 and returned to Ireland.  He became the Irish correspondent for the London Morning Herald as well as a clerk in the Dublin police office. He was married to Hannah Cumming in 1819, and had several children. He died in Dublin in 1853.

Legacy
Cox's Adventures on the Columbia River (London, 1831) is one of the most important documents relating to the later history of the North West Company. Several geographic features in Canada, including Ross Cox Creek and Mount Ross Cox are named after him.

External links 
 The Quebec History Encyclopedia
 Adventures on the Columbia River. Ross Cox. New York: 1832.
 Biography at the Dictionary of Canadian Biography Online

References

Irish explorers of North America
Explorers of Oregon
North West Company people
Writers from Dublin (city)
Irish emigrants to the United States (before 1923)
1793 births
1853 deaths